is a 2001 Japanese action film directed by Shinsuke Sato. It is a reimagining of the manga Lady Snowblood by Kazuo Koike and Kazuo Kamimura.

Story 
Yuki is the last surviving royal of the House of Takemikazuchi, who live in a futuristic post-apocalyptic isolationist world, where they use their skills as former Mikado guards to become hired assassins. The wise old sage Kuka, who was once Yuki's mother's bodyguard, gives Yuki information that changes her life—and her destiny. She discovers that the criminal Byakurai has a dangerous connection to her.

After learning this information, she chooses to leave the House of Takemikazuchi. She soon encounters Takashi, leader of the rebel movement, who offers Yuki a chance at revenge—and perhaps love. They soon discover similarities, for they are both trying to escape the past to start new lives.

Cast 
 Yumiko Shaku as Yuki
 Hideaki Itō as Takashi
 Shiro Sano as Kidokoro
 Yoichi Numata as Kuka
 Kyūsaku Shimada as Byakurai
 Yoko Chosokabe as Soma
 Yōko Maki as Aya
 Naomasa Musaka as Kiri
 Yutaka Matsushige as Anka
 Shintarō Sonooka as Chain Wielder
 Takashi Tsukamoto as Takashi's Friend

External links 
 
 
 

2001 films
2001 science fiction action films
Live-action films based on manga
Films directed by Shinsuke Sato
Japanese science fiction action films
2000s Japanese-language films
Japanese martial arts films
Japanese post-apocalyptic films
Samurai films
Discotek Media
Films scored by Kenji Kawai
2000s Japanese films

ja:修羅雪姫